Jordan, officially the Municipality of Jordan, is a 3rd class municipality and capital of the province of Guimaras, Philippines. According to the 2020 census, it has a population of 39,566 people, making it the third largest settlement in the province.

With a wharf closest to Iloilo City and a central location, Jordan is also the commercial center of the island.

Jordan is bounded by the three municipalities of the province, Buenavista to the north, San Lorenzo to the east, and Sibunag to the south. Before founding of the five towns, the whole island of Guimaras was called "Himal-us".  Across the Iloilo Strait from Jordan is Iloilo City on the island of Panay.

Jordan is a part of the Metro Iloilo–Guimaras area, centered on Iloilo City.

History
The name of the town used to be Nagaba but was changed in 1902 to Jordan. The name Jordán, the Spanish name for the Jordan River, was chosen by the residents in honor of John the Baptist, their patron saint. According to local folklore, he saved the inhabitants from slaughter during the Moro raid in the Spanish era.

In 1918, the municipality was formed when it separated from Buenavista, with Valeriano Villanueva as the first appointed Presidente Municipal. After elections in 1919, Hugo Chávez became the next mayor, followed by Licerio Segovia (1921-1923), Alberto Gonzaga (1923-1925), Feliz Ronzales (1925-1928), Hilario Nava (1929-1932), again Hugo Chávez (1932-1938), and Leodegario Galarpe (1939-1941).

Nueva Valencia was established as a separate municipality in 1941. In July 1995 San Lorenzo and Sibunag were created, leaving Jordan with only 14 barangays. Before these two towns was created, Jordan was composed of 33 barangays.

Geography

Barangays
Jordan is subdivided into 14 barangays.

Climate

Demographics

In the 2000 census, in an area of 126 km2., it had a population of 28,745 people in 5,397 households, and in 2007, 32,525 people. In the 2010 census, its population had increased to 34,791 persons.

Geography
Balaan bukid, a 558 feet (170 meters) mountain, located in Barangay Balcon Melliza, Jordan, Guimaras

Notable personalities

Chrisanta Seboc - Child hero who saved two of her younger siblings from a fire at home in July 1996.

References

External links

Philippine Standard Geographic Code
Philippine Census Information

Municipalities of Guimaras
Provincial capitals of the Philippines